HMS Ceres  is a Royal Naval Reserve unit located in Leeds, West Yorkshire.

History

The former HMS Ceres was a Royal Naval Reserve (RNR) unit in Yeadon, West Yorkshire which was decommissioned in 1995 in the wake of the Options for Change restructuring programme.

In 1999 the decision was made to re-establish a Royal Naval Reserve presence in West Yorkshire and a satellite unit named Calder Division was opened in Batley to train communications ratings, although the temporary nature of the accommodation and limited equipment led to recruitment and retention difficulties.  An alternative building, Carr Lodge, was found within Carlton Barracks, Leeds and underwent refurbishment providing modern facilities.

The unit was renamed Ceres Division and was officially opened by Rear Admiral K. John Borley, Flag Officer Training and Recruitment, on 14 May 2005 with a guard paraded by its then-parent unit, HMS Sherwood, and music provided by the Band of HM Royal Marines, Scotland.

A plan to refurbish and extend Carr Lodge was approved with work completed in 2015 on a new two-storey training wing with state-of-the-art classrooms, enlarged changing rooms and an accommodation block with permanent bed spaces.  Previous works had added a storage facility and a galley.

Commissioning

On a visit to the unit on 21 May 2015 the Head of the Maritime Reserves, Commodore Andrew Jameson, announced that Ceres Division would be commissioned, becoming the sixth HMS Ceres on 1 September 2015. The unit was formally commissioned on 6 February 2016 by The Princess Royal who dedicated the new facilities. A Royal Guard paraded with the RNR Queen's Colour of the Royal Navy and music was provided by the Band of HM Royal Marines, Plymouth.

Affiliations

The unit was affiliated to HMS Ark Royal before she was decommissioned in March 2011 and remains affiliated to the Royal Navy Historic Flight, which flies Fairey Swordfish Mk.I W5856, City Of Leeds.

Location
Situated in Leeds city centre, HMS Ceres resides within Carlton Barracks, which also houses Leeds Detachment, Royal Marines Reserve Merseyside, several Army Reserve units and Leeds University Officers' Training Corps. The unit shares Carr Lodge with the Yorkshire Universities Royal Navy Unit, operating a shared mess, although each unit has separate offices, galleys, and training classrooms. Carlton Barracks is within walking distance of Leeds railway station and city bus routes and is situated just off the A58(M), near Leeds Arena.

See also
British Armed Forces
List of Royal Navy shore establishments

References

External links
HMS Ceres page on official Royal Navy site
Royal Naval Reserve official site
Reserve Forces and Cadets Association for Yorkshire and the Humber

Royal Navy shore establishments
Military installations established in 2015